The International Federation of Vexillological Associations (FIAV) is an international federation of 53 regional, national, and multinational associations and institutions across the globe that study vexillology, which FIAV defines in its constitution as "the creation and development of a body of knowledge about flags of all types, their forms and functions, and of scientific theories and principles based on that knowledge."

History
The study of flags, or vexillology, was formalised by Whitney Smith in 1957. He then moved to organize various flag organisations and meetings including the first International Congress of Vexillology in 1965 and International Federation of Vexillological Associations.

The FIAV was provisionally organized on 3 September 1967, at the Second International Congress of Vexillology held in Rüschlikon, Switzerland, and officially created on 7 September 1969, at the Third International Congress of Vexillology held in Boston, Massachusetts, US.

Governance
FIAV has a three-person Board consisting of a President, Secretary-General, and Secretary-General for Congresses.  The Board manages the current affairs of FIAV and convenes the biennial sessions of the General Assembly, which are held during each International Congress of Vexillology. The FIAV General Assembly is composed of a delegate from each of FIAV's members.  The General Assembly elects the Board and is responsible for setting policy.

Officers
The current members of the FIAV Board are:
  (President)
 Bruce Berry (Secretary–General)
 Graham Bartram (Secretary–General for Congresses)

Members

Current members of FIAV are:

International Congresses of Vexillology
The International Congress of Vexillology is a week long biennial conference. A Congress consists of vexillology presentations, FIAV's General Assembly and flag display tours.

Since 1969, FIAV has sponsored the biennial International Congresses of Vexillology (ICV) with assistance of a local organizing committee. The Congresses have been held in:

 Muiderberg, Netherlands (1965)
 Zürich and Rüschlikon (1967)
 Boston (1969)
 Turin (1971)
 London (1973)
 IJsselmeer (1975)
 Washington, D.C. (1977)
 Vienna (1979)
 Ottawa (1981)
 Oxford (1983)
 Madrid (1985)
 San Francisco (1987)
 Melbourne (1989)
 Barcelona (1991)
 Zürich (1993)
 Warsaw (1995)
 Cape Town (1997)
 Victoria, British Columbia (1999)
 York (2001)
 Stockholm (2003)
 Buenos Aires (2005)
 Berlin (2007)
 Yokohama (2009)
 Alexandria, Virginia (2011)
 Rotterdam (2013)
 Sydney (2015)
 London (2017)
 San Antonio (2019)
 Ljubljana (2022)

ICV 30 is planned to be held in Beijing (China) in 2024.

FIAV flag

The FIAV flag was initially designed by Klaes Sierksma and slightly modified by the organizing committee of the Second International Congress of Vexillology.  The flag was introduced on 3 September 1967.  Its description is, "On a blue field, extending horizontally from hoist to fly, two yellow halyards forming two interlaced loops."  The knot formed is a sheet bend.  The color blue is defined as Pantone Matching System U293 and the color yellow is defined as Pantone Matching System U123.  Flags for the three officers were approved in 1999, having been designed by the former FIAV president, William Crampton.

FIAV Honours and Medals
Many awards and medals are given out to members of the FIAV or members of an FIAV associated Organization for various reasons.
The two medals that come with post-nominals are the LAUREATES OF THE FEDERATION who get LF and the FELLOWS OF THE FEDERATION who get FF.

References

External links
 

 
Organizations established in 1967
Vexillological organizations
Organizations based in Houston
International organisations based in London